The Ministry of Education of the Republic of Serbia is the ministry in the Serbian government that oversees the country's education system. The current minister is Branko Ružić, who has been in office since 28 October 2020.

History
The Ministry of Education, Science and Technological Development was established on 11 February 1991.

From 2001 to 2007, the Ministry of Youth and Sports was merged into the Ministry of Education. It was later split from the Ministry and reestablished. 

The ministry of science and technological development, which had existed under different names since 1991, was merged into the education ministry on 14 March 2011. When the third cabinet of Ana Brnabić was established on 26 October 2022, it was again separated from the education ministry as the ministry of science, technological development, and innovation.

Subordinate institutions
There are several agencies and institutions that operate within the scope of the Ministry:
 Institute for the Advancement of Education
 Institute for the Evaluation of the Quality of Education and Upbringing
 Intellectual Property Office
 Republican Talent's Center
 Primary education
 Secondary education
 Higher education
 Student standard
 Secondary education standard
 Scientific institutions

List of ministers
Political Party:

See also
 Ministry of Science (Serbia)
 Education in Serbia

References

External links
 
 Serbian ministries, etc – Rulers.org

Education
1991 establishments in Serbia
Ministries established in 1991
Serbia
Serbia